Lucian "Mihail" Popescu (11 November 1960 — 31 January 2021) was a Romanian ice hockey player. He played for CSA Steaua București between 1976 and 1991. Internationally Popescu played for the Romanian national team at five World Championships (the B Pool in 1979, 1981, and 1983; the D Pool in 1989 and 1990), and at the 1980 Winter Olympics in Lake Placid. He later coached the Romanian under-18 team. He died on 31 January 2021 in Bucharest at the age of 60.

References

External links
 

1960 births
2021 deaths
Ice hockey players at the 1980 Winter Olympics
Olympic ice hockey players of Romania
Romanian ice hockey defencemen
Steaua Rangers players